Protosilvanus is a genus of beetles in the family Silvanidae, containing the following species:

 Protosilvanus carinatus Grouvelle
 Protosilvanus dehradunicus Pal & Sen Gupta
 Protosilvanus fasciatus Halstead
 Protosilvanus granosus Grouvelle
 Protosilvanus inaequalis Grouvelle
 Protosilvanus lateritius Reitter

References

Silvanidae genera